Gayhurst is a village in Buckinghamshire, England.

Gayhurst may also refer to:

 Gayhurst House, or Gayhurst Court, a late-Elizabethan country house in Buckinghamshire, England
 Gayhurst School,  a preparatory school in Buckinghamshire, England
Gayhurst-Partie-Sud-Est, now known as Saint-Ludger, Quebec, Canada